This is a list of notable gabber artists and DJs.

 3 Steps Ahead - Netherlands
 Angerfist - Netherlands
 Charly Lownoise & Mental Theo - Netherlands
 Critical Mass - Netherlands
 DJ Paul Elstak - Netherlands
 DJ Sharkey - United Kingdom
 DJ Skinhead - United States
 Evil Activities - Netherlands
 Euromasters - Netherlands
 The Horrorist - USA
 The Laziest Men on Mars - United States
 Lenny Dee - United States
 Marc Acardipane - Germany
 Miro - Germany
 Nasenbluten - Australia
 Neophyte - Netherlands
 The Outside Agency - Netherlands
 Party Animals - Netherlands
 The Prophet - Netherlands
 Ralphie Dee - United States
 Rotterdam Termination Source - Netherlands
 Rotterdam Terror Corps - Netherlands
 Ruffneck (a.k.a. D'Spyre, Juggernaut, Knightvision, Wedlock) - Netherlands
 Scott Brown - Scotland
 Teranoid (alias of Kosuke Saito) - Japan
 Tommyknocker - Italy
 XOL DOG 400 - Germany
 Polaventris - Finland

Hardcore (electronic dance music genre)